The OSCE Minsk Group was created in 1992 by the Conference on Security and Cooperation in Europe (CSCE), now Organization for Security and Co-operation in Europe (OSCE), to encourage a peaceful, negotiated resolution to the conflict between Azerbaijan and Armenia over Nagorno-Karabakh.

Founding and members
The Helsinki Additional Meeting of the CSCE Council on 24 March 1992, requested the Chairman-in-Office to convene as soon as possible a conference on Nagorno-Karabakh under the auspices of the CSCE to provide an ongoing forum for negotiations towards a peaceful settlement of the crisis on the basis of the principles, commitments and provisions of the CSCE. The Conference is to take place in Minsk. Although it has not to this date been possible to hold the conference, the so-called Minsk Group spearheads the OSCE effort to find a political solution to this conflict.

On 6 December 1994, the Budapest Summit of Heads of State or Government decided to establish a co-chairmanship for the process. The Summit participants also expressed their political will to deploy multinational peacekeeping forces as an essential part of the overall settlement of the conflict.

Implementing the Budapest decision, the Hungarian Chairman-in-Office Marton Krasznai issued on 23 March 1995, the mandate for the Co-Chairmen of the Minsk Process.

The main objectives of the Minsk Process are as follows:

Providing an appropriate framework for conflict resolution in the way of assuring the negotiation process supported by the Minsk Group; 
Obtaining conclusion by the Parties of an agreement on the cessation of the armed conflict in order to permit the convening of the Minsk Conference; 
Promoting the peace process by deploying OSCE multinational peacekeeping forces.

The Minsk Group is headed by a co-chairmanship consisting of France, Russia and the United States. Furthermore, the Minsk Group also includes the following participating states: Belarus, Finland, Germany, Italy, Sweden, Turkey as well as Armenia and Azerbaijan. On a rotating basis, the OSCE Troika is also a permanent member.

The co-chairmen of the Minsk Group are: Ambassador Brice Roquefeuil of France, Ambassador Igor Khovaev of the Russian Federation, and Ambassador Andrew Schofer of the United States.

The Minsk Conference on Nagorno-Karabakh is attended by the same participating States that are members of the Minsk Group. The Conference is headed by the Co-Chairmen of the Minsk Conference.

Activities
In early 2001 representatives of Armenia, Azerbaijan, France, Russia and the United States met in Paris and in Key West, Florida. The talks in Key West however were largely kept secret and were not followed upon.

On 7 October 2002 during the CIS summit in Chisinau, the usefulness of the Minsk Group in peace negotiations was brought up for discussion by both the Armenian and the Azerbaijani delegations. According to them the ten-year-long OSCE mediation had not been effective enough.

On 19 December 2015, Serzh Sargsyan and Ilham Aliyev held a summit in Bern, Switzerland under the auspices of the Co-Chairs. The Presidents supported ongoing work to reduce the risk of violence and confirmed their readiness to continue engagement on a settlement. The last summit between Ilham Aliyev and Serzh Sargsyan, organized by Minsk Group, took place on October 16, 2017  in Geneva, Switzerland. The presidents agreed to take appropriate actions in order to reinforce the negotiations process and decrease tensions on the Line of Contact.

After 2020 Nagorno-Karabakh war 
After the 2020 Nagorno-Karabakh war, Azerbaijani government took a position that OSCE Minsk Group should no longer be dealing with the Nagorno-Karabakh conflict as "it has been resolved". Ilham Aliyev in his interview to the local media on January 12, 2022 said that after 30 years of experience, the Minsk Group co-chairs "are on the verge of retirement" and therefore "he wishes them good health and a long life”.  The format where Russia, the US, and France worked as a team for a long period stalled due to geopolitical confrontation between Russia and the West. Russian Foreign minister Sergey Lavrov on April 8, 2022 said “Our so-called French and American partners in this group, in a Russophobic frenzy and in an effort to cancel everything related to the Russian Federation, said that they would not communicate with us in this format. This, however, did not create a peacekeeping vacuum, as European Union has intensified its efforts to provide reconciliation between Armenia with Azerbaijan. In April 2022, the Russian, French and American co-chairs of the OSCE Minsk Group visited Armenia. Karen Donfried, the US Assistant Secretary of State for European and Eurasian Affairs, said on 20 June 2022 that even if Azerbaijan does not support OSCE Minsk group process, the United States and France will continue participating in it, and that will include cooperation with Russia. Sergei Lavrov  stated during his visit to Azerbaijan on 24 June 2022 that the OSCE Minsk Group ceased its activities at the initiative of the U.S. and France. Azerbaijan's foreign minister Jeyhun Bayramov also noted that interaction between the co-chairs of the OSCE Minsk Group has been completely paralyzed and that the peace process cannot be held hostage to and be guided by a non-existent format.

Proposed candidates for co-chairmanship
In 2015, Azay Guliyev, an Azerbaijani MP, proposed including of Turkey and Germany to the co-chairmanship, whereas Azerbaijani foreign affairs expert Rusif Huseynov proposed Kazakhstan as an additional co-chair in the Minsk Group as a "big actor in the post-Soviet area with  population culturally similar to the Azerbaijanis, but a member of several Kremlin-led organizations together with Armenia" with previous experience in the Nagorno-Karabakh conflict.

According to Matthew Bryza, former U.S. Ambassador to Azerbaijan, the EU would make more sense as a co-chair, because it would represent more of Europe and has experience mediating similar conflicts in the Balkans.

Criticism

International 
Former US co-chair of the Minsk Group Richard E. Hoagland, reflecting on his work with the Minsk Group, wrote that "very, very little ever got accomplished" by the group. He suggested that Minsk Group redefines its mission, e.g. by enabling reconstruction to its approved mandate, otherwise it may continue as "an intriguing backwater of international diplomacy". According to Carey Cavanaugh, another former US co-chair of the Minsk Group, the organization’s consensus-based decision-making process and its rotating leadership rendered it “structurally flawed” to act as a peacemaker, and the United Nations would have been a better option to facilitate peace.

Thomas de Waal, a senior fellow at Carnegie Europe, suggested that France leaves its co-chair position in favour of another European country with "more balanced relations with Armenia and Azerbaijan", such as Germany or Sweden, or an EU-wide position.

For analyst Laurence Broers, the Minsk Group’s future remains unclear, with its failure caused by factors like the normative ambiguity of its attempts to balance the countervailing principles of self-determination and territorial integrity; its secretive, narrow and top-down modus operandi; and its default to performative over substantive diplomacy since 2011, when occasional summits in far-away capitals with little or no interaction in between made the peace process alien to Armenian and Azerbaijani societies. Broers considers the Minsk Group to be "an artifact of the post-Cold War unipolar world" in the settings of growing multipolar world.

In Azerbaijan 
In Azerbaijan, OSCE's Minsk group is not popular, the presence of large Armenian diasporas in three co-chair countries - Russia, France, and the United States, strategic alliance between Russia and Armenia raising questions about fairness of the group. Criticism of the group for inefficiency started back in Heydar Aliyev's era, followed by his son and successor Ilham Aliyev.

During the 2020 Nagorno-Karabakh War, France received particularly harsh criticism in Azerbaijan, to the point of being viewed as "unworthy" to hold the position of the OSCE Minsk Group co-chair. After the French senate passed a resolution calling for recognition of independence of Nagorno-Karabakh, Azerbaijan's parliament passed a resolution calling for France to be expelled from the Minsk Group.

On January 12, 2022, Azerbaijan’s leader Ilham Aliyev stated that Azerbaijan would prevent the attempts of the OSCE Minsk Group to deal with the Karabakh issue, as he considered it to be "resolved". He pointed at "the lack of unity among the co-chairs, and the absence of an agenda agreed between them", and approval of that agenda by Azerbaijan and Armenia.

See also
Armenia–OSCE relations
Azerbaijan–OSCE relations
Minsk Protocol, OSCE document on war in the eastern Ukraine
OSCE assessment mission to Armenia

References

Further reading

External links
OSCE: Minsk Process

Organizations established in 1992
First Nagorno-Karabakh War
Organization for Security and Co-operation in Europe
Peace processes